Vincenzo Sinatra (1720, Noto – 1765) was a Sicilian architect. He was a pupil of Rosario Gagliardi.  Sinatra worked in both the Baroque style and later in  Neo-Classical style.

Following the 1693 earthquake, the city of Noto was completely rebuilt on a new site.  Sinatra was responsible for many of the new buildings in the new city.  His works in the city included the "Church of Montevergine", the "Church of San Giovanni Battista" and the "Basilica di Santa Maria Maggiore" and its Loggiato in Ispica.  One of his most notable works was the ground floor of the  Palazzo Ducezio (now the town hall known as the Municipio) which was begun in 1746; an upper floor was added in similar style in the early 20th century. He also designed the church of San Paolo, Palazzolo Acreide.

External links

La Basilica di S. Maria Maggiore 

1720 births
1765 deaths
People from Noto
18th-century Italian architects
Architects of the Sicilian Baroque